Hylaeus kuakea is a species of bee that is endemic to Hawaii and known from only two populations. In September 2016, H. kuakea and six other Hawaiian yellow-faced bee species were listed for protection under the United States Endangered Species Act. This marked a first listing for any bee species in the US.

Description
Hylaeus kuakea is small and colored black. Its wings have a somewhat smoky color. While it has some facial markings similar to some other Hylaeus species, H. kuakea is distinguished by an ivory-colored marking covering its lower face. These characteristics have been observed in male specimens, females have not yet been collected or observed.

Distribution and habitat
Hylaeus kuakea is currently known only from two patches of lowland forest in the Waianae Mountains on Oahu. Threats to the species include habitat degradation by nonnative animals and plants, predation by nonnative insects, fires and climate change.

References

Colletidae
Insects of Hawaii
Endemic fauna of Hawaii
Endangered fauna of Hawaii
Hymenoptera of Oceania
Insects described in 2003
ESA endangered species